Dulhin Bazar is a town and an assembly constituency in Paliganj subdivision of Patna district in the Indian state of Bihar.

Cities and towns in Patna district